Samir Maharramli  (born 17 July 2002) is an Azerbaijani footballer who plays as a midfielder for Kapaz in the Azerbaijan Premier League.

Club career
On 21 August 2022, Maharramli made his debut in the Azerbaijan Premier League for Kapaz match against Gabala.

References

External links
 

2002 births
Living people
Association football midfielders
Azerbaijani footballers
Azerbaijan youth international footballers
Azerbaijan under-21 international footballers
Azerbaijan Premier League players
Sabah FC (Azerbaijan) players
Kapaz PFK players